The Charterhouse of Las Fuentes is a Carthusian monastery, or charterhouse, in Aragon, Spain. It was established in 1507.

See also
"Into Great Silence"—an award-winning documentary on the Carthusian monks
List of Carthusian monasteries
Monastic Family of Bethlehem, of the Assumption of the Virgin and of Saint Bruno

Religious buildings and structures completed in 1507
Monasteries in Aragon
Carthusian monasteries in Spain

es:Cartuja de Nuestra Señora de las Fuentes